Binocular Dysphoria is a hypothesized condition where the brain adapts to an alternative way of perceiving depth cues.  3-D films, televisions, virtual reality headsets, and other devices simulate the experience of three dimensions through stereoscopic techniques, presenting slightly different images to the left and right eyes.  Through stereo vision, the primary cue for human depth perception, the brain interprets the images as being in three dimensions.  However, current technology does not allow the displays to simulate the many other cues to depth perception, so most viewers ignore those cues while viewing 3D displays.  Virtual Reality researcher Mark Pesce argues, citing research in Japan, Britain, and America, that there is an adjustment period after watching simulated 3D during which vision is impaired, and that overconsumption of 3D content could lead to increased risk of accidents or even permanent impairment.  Pesce says that an unreleased product safety study by Sega led the company to cancel the release of a head-mounted display for the Sega Genesis in the mid 1990s.

At present there is no peer reviewed evidence of this condition.

References

Visual disturbances and blindness